Immortal is Japanese heavy metal band Anthem's fifth studio album since their reformation in the year 2000. In Europe the album was sold together with the Anthem 20th Anniversary Tour 2005 bonus DVD; this DVD included several videos of the band rehearsing some of the songs that were including in the album: "Immortal Bind", "Insomnia", "Mob Groove" and "Road to Nowhere".  This bonus DVD is known as "Core".

Track listing
 "Immortal Bind" (Shibata) - 4:32
 "Soul Motor" (Shibata) - 3:34
 "Mob Groove" (Shibata) - 4:26
 "Ignite" (Shibata) - 3:59
 "The Beginning" (Shibata) - 4:05
 "Freak Out!" (Shibata) - 4:50
 "Insomnia" (Shimizu) - 4:13
 "Unknown World" (Shibata) - 4:41
 "Betrayer" (Shibata) - 3:58
 "Echoes in the Dark" (Sakamoto, Shimizu) - 5:15
 "Road to Nowhere" (Shibata) - 4:05

Personnel

Band members
Eizo Sakamoto - vocals
Akio Shimizu - guitars
Naoto Shibata - bass, producer
Hirotsugu Homma - drums

References

2006 albums
Anthem (band) albums
Victor Entertainment albums